Fjellenstrup halt is a railway halt serving the settlement of Fjellenstrup near Gilleleje on the north coast of Zealand, Denmark.

Fjellenstrup halt is located on the Gribskov Line from Hillerød to Gilleleje. The train services are currently operated by the railway company Lokaltog which runs frequent local train services between Helsingør station and Gilleleje station.

See also
 List of railway stations in Denmark

References

External links
 Lokaltog
 Gribskovbanen on jernbanen.dk

Railway stations in the Capital Region of Denmark
Buildings and structures in Gribskov Municipality